Dan Muys (born December 25, 1970) is a Canadian politician and public relations consultant who serves in the House of Commons of Canada as the Member of Parliament for Flamborough-Glanbrook.

A member of the Conservative Party of Canada, he was elected in the 2021 Canadian federal election.

Prior to being elected, Muys worked behind the scenes politically for many years. From 2008-2020, he was the Chief of Staff for his predecessor, former MP David Sweet.  He has held office positions at Queen’s Park and on Parliament Hill, including the provincial Minister’s Office for Economic Development, Job Creation & Trade, and for Brian Mulroney-era federal trade minister Michael Wilson. He is also the Ontario PC Party Regional Vice President for South Central Ontario.

Muys worked in the private sector for 20 years as a public relations and communications consultant, mostly in the sectors of agriculture, agri-food and energy. His work included large-scale projects with Cargill and TransCanada (now TC Energy). A Cargill campaign that he managed led to a CAMA award for public relations in 2004.

His community involvement includes serving as a board member for both the Royal Botanical Gardens and Canadian Public Relations Society, as well as membership with the Ancaster Rotary Club.

In 2021, Muys was acclaimed as the federal Conservative candidate for Flamborough-Glanbrook upon the retirement of David Sweet.

Muys currently serves as Associate Shadow Minister for Transport. 
He previously served as the Deputy Shadow Minister for Infrastructure and Communities.

He is married and lives in Lynden, Ontario.

References

External links

Living people
21st-century Canadian politicians
Conservative Party of Canada MPs
Members of the House of Commons of Canada from Ontario
1970 births
Wilfrid Laurier University alumni
Politicians from Hamilton, Ontario